Alona Bondarenko and Kateryna Bondarenko were the defending champions but they chose not to compete this year.

Seeds

Draw

Draw

External links
Draw

Open GDF Suez - Doubles
Doubles 2009